Ceratobunellus is a genus of harvestmen in the family Sclerosomatidae from India.

Species
 Ceratobunellus calcuttensis (With, 1903)
 Ceratobunellus brevipes (With, 1903)
 Ceratobunellus philippinus Roewer, 1955

References

Harvestmen